Thomas William Broadbent (born 15 February 1992) is an English professional footballer who plays as a central defender for South Shields.

Career
Born in Basingstoke, Broadbent spent time with the youth academies of Southampton, Portsmouth and Bournemouth. He then began playing first-team football for Bognor Regis Town at the age of 16, before moving to Chichester City. He also spent time with Pagham and Selsey.

After working in a supermarket and as a carpenter and labourer, Broadbent joined the Army at the age of 19. Broadbent spent 6 years in the Army, serving as a Lance Bombadier with the Royal Artillery in Afghanistan. He represented the Army at football, and in 2015 he began playing semi-professional non-league football, appearing for Farnborough, Petersfield Town and Hayes & Yeading United. He captained Hayes & Yeading for the 2016–17 season.

Bristol Rovers
After leaving the Army to start a career in professional football, Broadbent signed for Bristol Rovers in July 2017. He made his professional debut on the opening day of the 2017–18 season, playing the entirety of a 1–0 away defeat at Charlton Athletic. 

Broadbent scored his first professional goal on 8 January 2019 in a 2–1 EFL Trophy victory over Northampton Town, opening the scoring on the stroke of half-time, in the match which proved to be his final game for the club.

Swindon Town
He moved to Swindon Town in January 2019. He made his debut on 26 January in a 1–0 home defeat to Crawley Town. 

He scored his first goal for Swindon on 10 November 2020 in an EFL Trophy group game against Forest Green Rovers. Broadbent featured nine times in the league across the 2019–20 season when despite the league's early curtailment due to the COVID-19 pandemic, Swindon were awarded the League Two title on a points-per-game basis.

Broadbent's first league goal for the club came on 28 November 2020, when he scored an 85th minute equaliser as Swindon produced an impressive comeback to defeat rivals Oxford United, Tyler Smith going on to score a late winner. The 2020–21 season ultimately ended in disappointment for Swindon as immediate relegation back to League Two was confirmed with two matches remaining with a 5–0 defeat at Milton Keynes Dons, Broadbent being brought on as a substitute in the first half. On 14 May 2021 it was announced that he would leave Swindon at the end of the season, following the expiry of his contract.

Eastleigh
In July 2021, Broadbent joined National League side Eastleigh following his release from Swindon. Broadbent had to wait until 9 October to make his debut, playing the full ninety minutes as Eastleigh got a late winner at Wealdstone. Broadbent joked after the match that he was so tired after his return from injury that he was unable to celebrate the last minute winner. Broadbent was released at the end of the 2021–22 season.

South Shields
On 29 June 2022, Broadbent joined Northern Premier League Premier Division club South Shields, a deal described by Broadbent's new manager Kevin Phillips as a "massive coup".

Career statistics

Honours
Swindon Town
EFL League Two: 2019–20

References

1992 births
Living people
Footballers from Hampshire
Sportspeople from Basingstoke
English footballers
Association football defenders
Southampton F.C. players
Portsmouth F.C. players
AFC Bournemouth players
Bognor Regis Town F.C. players
Chichester City F.C. players
Pagham F.C. players
Selsey F.C. players
Farnborough F.C. players
Petersfield Town F.C. players
Hayes & Yeading United F.C. players
Bristol Rovers F.C. players
Swindon Town F.C. players
Eastleigh F.C. players
South Shields F.C. (1974) players
Southern Football League players
English Football League players
National League (English football) players
Northern Premier League players
Royal Artillery soldiers
British Army personnel of the War in Afghanistan (2001–2021)